Charles Maddock (14 August 1887 – 14 February 1957) was an Australian cricketer. He played in two first-class matches for Queensland in 1919/20.

Cricket career
Maddock was raised in Warwick, Queensland and began his cricket career there but later moved to Goodna where he became well-known as a cricketer. In March 1919 the Queensland Cricket Association organized a special match between former First-class players and a Colts team of promising young cricketers and Maddock was selected in the Colts side. He was noted as being the hardest hitting batsman in Queensland and it was also noted he had been very successful with the ball recently.

Maddock was selected in the Queensland First-class side in the 1919/20 season playing two First-class games in which he struggled taking just 1 wicket at an average of 145 and scoring 17 runs at an average of 8.5. His state career was cut short as he came under suspicion of stealing from the dressing room during matches and a trap was set for him in early 1920 when Queensland played the A.I.F. side with marked bank notes being placed in the dressing room. He admitted to stealing when caught and claimed that while he had a good position working at the Goodna Hospital as he had a wife and four children he was in poverty. He was sentenced on three charges to imprisonment for one month and one month and fourteen days of hard labour.

See also
 List of Queensland first-class cricketers

References

External links
 

1887 births
1957 deaths
Australian cricketers
Queensland cricketers
Cricketers from Queensland